The Jewish Women Artists' Circle is a women's artist collective based in the Twin Cities of Minnesota. It was founded by Lucy Rose Fischer in the summer of 2005. 

The group consists of a number of women artists in different fields, who study with scholars on Jewish themes and have developed a number of exhibits. The collective's 2008 exhibition Neshama: Visions of the Soul was held at the University of Minnesota's Larson Art Gallery. Their 2010 exhibition, Tikun:Repair, was held at Adath Jeshurun Congregation and the Basilica of Saint Mary in Minneapolis.

References

External links
Official website

American artist groups and collectives
Women's organizations based in the United States
Jewish organizations based in the United States
Arts organizations based in Minneapolis
Arts organizations established in 2005
2005 establishments in Minnesota
Jews and Judaism in Minneapolis–Saint Paul